Fueki is a surname of Japanese origin. Notable people with the surname include:

Chie Fueki (born 1973), Japanese-American painter
Yuko Fueki (born 1979), Japanese-Korean actress
Yasuhiro Fueki (born 1985), Japanese male hurdler

Japanese-language surnames